Brian Farlow (born November 27, 1964) is a swimmer who represented the United States Virgin Islands. He competed in four events at the 1984 Summer Olympics.

References

External links
 

1964 births
Living people
United States Virgin Islands male swimmers
Olympic swimmers of the United States Virgin Islands
Swimmers at the 1984 Summer Olympics
Sportspeople from Syracuse, New York